Reinmann is a German surname. Notable people with the surname include:

Arthur Reinmann (1901–1983), Swiss weightlifter
Baptist Reinmann (1903–1980), German footballer
Thomas Reinmann (born 1983), Swiss footballer

See also
Reinman

German-language surnames